A184 may refer to:
 A184 road (England), a road connecting Sunderland and Gateshead
 HMNZS Endeavour (A-184), 1962 New Zealand Navy Patapsco-class gasoline tanker
 A-184 torpedo, an Italian torpedo